James Joseph Gerrard (June 9, 1897 – June 3, 1991) was a bishop of the Catholic Church in the United States. He served as an auxiliary bishop of the Diocese of Fall River from 1959 to 1976.

Biography
Born in New Bedford, Massachusetts, James Gerrard was educated at Holy Family High School in New Bedford and St. Laurent College in Montreal.  He studied for the priesthood at St. Bernard's Seminary in Rochester, New York and was ordained a priest on May 26, 1923, for the Diocese of Fall River.  On February 2, 1959 Pope John XXIII appointed him as the Titular Bishop of Forma and Auxiliary Bishop of Fall River.  He was consecrated by Bishop James Connolly on March 19, 1959. The principal co-consecrators were Bishop Russell McVinney of Providence and Auxiliary Bishop Jeremiah Minihan of Boston.  Gerrard attended the second session of the Second Vatican Council.  He served as auxiliary bishop until his resignation was accepted by Pope Paul VI on January 12, 1976.  He died at the Catholic Memorial Home in Fall River, Massachusetts on June 3, 1991, at the age of 93.

References

1897 births
1991 deaths
People from New Bedford, Massachusetts
Roman Catholic Diocese of Fall River
20th-century American Roman Catholic titular bishops
Participants in the Second Vatican Council
Religious leaders from Massachusetts
Catholics from Massachusetts